Andrew Arcedeckne (8 January 1780 – 8 February 1849) was a British landowner and MP.

He was the eldest son of Jamaica plantation owner Chaloner Arcedeckne of Cockfield Hall and Glevering Hall, Suffolk and educated at Eton College and Christ Church, Oxford. He succeeded his father in 1809 and made Glevering Hall his home.

He was appointed High Sheriff of Suffolk for 1819–1820 and was Member of Parliament for the rotten borough of Dunwich from 1826 to 1831.

He owned two plantations in St Thomas in the East, Jamaica, Golden Grove and Bachelor's Hall Pen.

He married his cousin Ann Harriet, the daughter of Francis Love Beckford of Basing Park.

References

External links 
 

1780 births
1849 deaths
Members of the Parliament of the United Kingdom for English constituencies
UK MPs 1826–1830
UK MPs 1830–1831
High Sheriffs of Suffolk
People educated at Eton College
Alumni of Christ Church, Oxford